Seahaven is the name given to an area in East Sussex that includes the towns of Seaford and Newhaven and Peacehaven and the surrounding towns in the Ouse Valley which leads to the East Sussex county town of Lewes.

The Seahaven name is used by the sports centre in Newhaven, the local police force, the local community radio station and many businesses.

References

External links
Seaford Town Website, tides, trains, weather, local directory etc
Newhaven Town Website, Swing Bridge times, tides, trains, weather, local directory etc
Peacehaven Town Website, tides, trains, weather, local directory etc

Geography of East Sussex
Lewes District